Tashan-e Sharqi Rural District is a rural district (dehestan) in Tashan District, Behbahan County, Khuzestan Province, Iran. At the 2006 census, its population was 9,656, in 1,992 families.  The rural district has 35 villages.

References 

Rural Districts of Khuzestan Province
Behbahan County